Kolanı (also, Kolany and Gashim-Khanly) is a village in the Salyan Rayon of Azerbaijan.  The village forms part of the municipality of Qarabağlı.

References 

Populated places in Salyan District (Azerbaijan)